The terraforming of Mars or the terraformation of Mars is a hypothetical procedure that would consist of a planetary engineering project or concurrent projects, with the goal to transform Mars from a planet hostile to terrestrial life to one that can sustainably host humans and other lifeforms free of protection or mediation. The process would involve the modification of the planet's extant climate, atmosphere, and surface through a variety of resource-intensive initiatives, and the installation of a novel ecological system or systems.

Justifications for choosing Mars over other potential terraforming targets include the presence of water and a geological history that suggests it once harbored a dense atmosphere similar to Earth's. Hazards and difficulties include low gravity, low light levels relative to Earth's, and the lack of a magnetic field. 

Disagreement exists about whether current technology could render the planet habitable. Reasons for objecting to terraforming include ethical concerns about terraforming and the considerable cost that such an undertaking would involve. Reasons for terraforming the planet include allaying concerns about resource use and depletion on Earth and arguments that the altering and subsequent or concurrent settlement of other planets decreases the odds of humanity's extinction.

Motivation and side effects 

Future population growth, demand for resources, and an alternate solution to the Doomsday argument may require human colonization of bodies other than Earth, such as Mars, the Moon, and other objects. Space colonization would facilitate harvesting the Solar System's energy and material resources.

In many aspects, Mars is the most Earth-like of all the other planets in the Solar System. It is thought that Mars had a more Earth-like environment early in its geological history, with a thicker atmosphere and abundant water that was lost over the course of hundreds of millions of years through atmospheric escape. Given the foundations of similarity and proximity, Mars would make one of the most plausible terraforming targets in the Solar System.

Side effects of terraforming include the potential displacement or destruction of any indigenous life if such life exists.

Challenges and limitations 

The Martian environment presents several terraforming challenges to overcome and the extent of terraforming may be limited by certain key environmental factors. Here is a list of some of the ways in which Mars differs from Earth, which terraforming  seeks to address:
 Reduced light levels (about 60% of Earth) 
 Low surface gravity (38% of Earth's)
 Unbreatheable atmosphere
 Atmospheric pressure (about 1% of Earth's; well below the Armstrong limit)
 Ionizing solar and cosmic radiation at the surface 
 Average temperature  compared to Earth average of )
 Molecular instability - bonds between atoms break down in critical molecules such as organic compounds
 Global dust storms
 No natural food source
 Toxic soil
 No global magnetic field to shield against the solar wind

Countering the effects of space weather

Mars doesn't have an intrinsic global magnetic field, but the solar wind directly interacts with the atmosphere of Mars, leading to the formation of a magnetosphere from magnetic field tubes. This poses challenges for mitigating solar radiation and retaining an atmosphere.

The lack of a magnetic field, its relatively small mass, and its atmospheric photochemistry, all would have contributed to the evaporation and loss of its surface liquid water over time. Solar wind–induced ejection of Martian atmospheric atoms has been detected by Mars-orbiting probes, indicating that the solar wind has stripped the Martian atmosphere over time. For comparison, while Venus has a dense atmosphere, it has only traces of water vapor (20 ppm) as it lacks a large, dipole-induced, magnetic field.
Earth's ozone layer provides additional protection. Ultraviolet light is blocked before it can dissociate water into hydrogen and oxygen.

Low gravity and pressure 
The surface gravity on Mars is 38% of that on Earth. It is not known if this is enough to prevent the health problems associated with weightlessness.

Mars's  atmosphere has about 1% the pressure of the Earth's at sea level. It is estimated that there is sufficient  ice in the regolith and the south polar cap to form a  atmosphere if it is released by planetary warming. The reappearance of liquid water on the Martian surface would add to the warming effects and atmospheric density, but the lower gravity of Mars requires 2.6 times Earth's column airmass to obtain the optimum  pressure at the surface. Additional volatiles to increase the atmosphere's density must be supplied from an external source, such as redirecting several massive asteroids (40-400 billion tonnes total) containing ammonia as a source of nitrogen.

Breathing on Mars 
Without a pressure suit, no amount of breathable oxygen delivered by any means will sustain oxygen-breathing life for more than a few minutes. In the NASA technical report Rapid (Explosive) Decompression Emergencies in Pressure-Suited Subjects, after exposure to pressure below the Armstrong limit, a survivor reported that his "last conscious memory was of the water on his tongue beginning to boil". In these conditions humans die within minutes unless a pressure suit provides life support.

If Mars' atmospheric pressure could rise above , then a pressure suit would not be required. Visitors would only need to wear a mask that supplied 100% oxygen under positive pressure. This might look similar to mountain climbers who venture into pressures below , also called the death zone, where an insufficient amount of bottled oxygen has often resulted in hypoxia with fatalities. However, if the increase in atmospheric pressure was achieved by increasing CO2 (or other toxic gas) the mask would have to ensure the external atmosphere did not enter the breathing apparatus. CO2 concentrations as low as 1% cause drowsiness in humans. Concentrations of 7% to 10% may cause suffocation, even in the presence of sufficient oxygen. (See Carbon dioxide toxicity.)

In 2021, the NASA Mars rover Perseverance was able to make oxygen on Mars. However, the process is complex and takes a lot of time to produce a small amount of oxygen.

Advantages 

According to scientists, Mars exists on the outer edge of the habitable zone, a region of the Solar System where liquid water on the surface may be supported if concentrated greenhouse gases could increase the atmospheric pressure. The lack of both a magnetic field and geologic activity on Mars may be a result of its relatively small size, which allowed the interior to cool more quickly than Earth's, although the details of such a process are still not well understood.

There are strong indications that Mars once had an atmosphere as thick as Earth's during an earlier stage in its development, and that its pressure supported abundant liquid water at the surface. Although water appears to have once been present on the Martian surface, ground ice currently exists from mid-latitudes to the poles. The soil and atmosphere of Mars contain many of the main elements crucial to life, including sulfur, nitrogen, hydrogen, oxygen, phosphorus and carbon.

Any climate change induced in the near term is likely to be driven by greenhouse warming produced by an increase in atmospheric carbon dioxide and a consequent increase in atmospheric water vapor. These two gases are the only likely sources of greenhouse warming that are available in large quantities in Mars' environment. Large amounts of water ice exist below the Martian surface, as well as on the surface at the poles, where it is mixed with dry ice, frozen . Significant amounts of water are located at the south pole of Mars, which, if melted, would correspond to a planetwide ocean 5–11 meters deep. Frozen carbon dioxide at the poles sublimes into the atmosphere during the Martian summers, and small amounts of water residue are left behind, which fast winds sweep off the poles at speeds approaching . This seasonal occurrence transports large amounts of dust and water ice into the atmosphere, forming Earth-like ice clouds.

Most of the oxygen in the Martian atmosphere is present as carbon dioxide, the main atmospheric component. Molecular oxygen (O2) only exists in trace amounts. Large amounts of oxygen can be also found in metal oxides on the Martian surface, and in the soil, in the form of per-nitrates. An analysis of soil samples taken by the Phoenix lander indicated the presence of perchlorate, which has been used to liberate oxygen in chemical oxygen generators. Electrolysis could be employed to separate water on Mars into oxygen and hydrogen if sufficient liquid water and electricity were available. However, if vented into the atmosphere it would escape into space.

Proposed methods and strategies 

Terraforming Mars would entail three major interlaced changes: building up the magnetosphere, building up the atmosphere, and raising the temperature. The atmosphere of Mars is relatively thin and has a very low surface pressure. Moreover, as it heats, more  should enter the atmosphere from the frozen reserves on the poles, enhancing the greenhouse effect. This means that the two processes of building the atmosphere and heating it would augment each other, favoring terraforming. However, it would be difficult to keep the atmosphere together because of the lack of a protective global magnetic field  against erosion by the solar wind.

Importing ammonia 
One method of augmenting the Martian atmosphere is to introduce ammonia (NH3). Large amounts of ammonia are likely to exist in frozen form on minor planets orbiting in the outer Solar System.  It might be possible to redirect the orbits of these or smaller ammonia-rich objects so that they collide with Mars, thereby transferring the ammonia into the Martian atmosphere. Ammonia is not stable in the Martian atmosphere, however.  It breaks down into (diatomic) nitrogen and hydrogen after a few hours. Thus, though ammonia is a powerful greenhouse gas, it is unlikely to generate much planetary warming.  Presumably, the nitrogen gas would eventually be depleted by the same processes that stripped Mars of much of its original atmosphere, but these processes are thought to have required hundreds of millions of years.  Being much lighter, the hydrogen would be removed much more quickly.  Carbon dioxide is 2.5 times the density of ammonia, and nitrogen gas, which Mars barely holds on to, is more than 1.5 times the density, so any imported ammonia that did not break down would also be lost quickly into space.

Importing hydrocarbons 

Another way to create a Martian atmosphere would be to import methane (CH4) or other hydrocarbons, which are common in Titan's atmosphere and on its surface; the methane could be vented into the atmosphere where it would act to compound the greenhouse effect. However, like ammonia (NH3), methane (CH4)  is a relatively light gas. It is in fact even less dense than ammonia and so would similarly be lost into space if it was introduced, and at a faster rate than ammonia. Even if a method could be found to prevent it escaping into space, methane can exist in the Martian atmosphere for only a limited period before it is destroyed. Estimates of its lifetime range from 0.6–4 years.

Use of fluorine compounds 

Especially powerful greenhouse gases, such as sulfur hexafluoride, chlorofluorocarbons (CFCs), or perfluorocarbons (PFCs), have been suggested both as a means of initially warming Mars and of maintaining long-term climate stability. Fluorine-based compounds such as sulphur hexafluoride and perfluorocarbons are preferable to chlorine-based ones as the latter destroys ozone. It has been estimated that approximately 0.3 microbars of CFCs would need to be introduced into Mars' atmosphere in order to sublimate the south polar  glaciers. This is equivalent to a mass of approximately 39 million tonnes, that is, about three times the amount of CFCs manufactured on Earth from 1972 to 1992 (when CFC production was banned by international treaty). Maintaining the temperature would require continual production of such compounds as they are destroyed due to photolysis. It has been estimated that introducing 170 kilotons of optimal greenhouse compounds (CF3CF2CF3, CF3SCF2CF3, SF6, SF5CF3, SF4(CF3)2) annually would be sufficient to maintain a 70-K greenhouse effect given a terraformed atmosphere with earth-like pressure and composition.

Typical proposals envision producing the gases on Mars using locally extracted materials, nuclear power, and a significant industrial effort.  The potential for mining fluorine-containing minerals to obtain the raw material necessary for the production of CFCs and PFCs is supported by mineralogical surveys of Mars that estimate the elemental presence of fluorine in the bulk composition of Mars at 32 ppm by mass (as compared to 19.4 ppm for the Earth).

Alternatively, CFCs might be introduced by sending rockets with payloads of compressed CFCs on collision courses with Mars. When the rockets crashed into the surface they would release their payloads into the atmosphere. A steady barrage of these "CFC rockets" would need to be sustained for a little over a decade while Mars changed chemically and became warmer.

Use of orbital mirrors

Mirrors made of thin aluminized PET film could be placed in orbit around Mars to increase the total insolation it receives. This would direct the sunlight onto the surface and could increase Mars's surface temperature directly. The 125 km radius mirror could be positioned as a statite, using its effectiveness as a solar sail to orbit in a stationary position relative to Mars, near the poles, to sublimate the  ice sheet and contribute to the warming greenhouse effect. However, certain problems have been found with this. The main concern is the difficulty of launching large mirrors from earth.

Albedo reduction

Reducing the albedo of the Martian surface would also make more efficient use of incoming sunlight in terms of heat absorption. This could be done by spreading dark dust from Mars's moons, Phobos and Deimos, which are among the blackest bodies in the Solar System; or by introducing dark extremophile microbial life forms such as lichens, algae and bacteria. The ground would then absorb more sunlight, warming the atmosphere. However, Mars is already the second darkest planet in the solar system, absorbing over 70% of incoming sunlight so the scope for darkening it further is small.

If algae or other green life were established, it would also contribute a small amount of oxygen to the atmosphere, though not enough to allow humans to breathe. In addition, because on Mars atmospheric oxygen is lost into space (unlike Earth where there is an Oxygen cycle), this would represent a permanent loss from the planet. For both of these reasons it would be necessary to cultivate such life inside a closed system. This would decrease the albedo of the closed system (assuming the growth had a lower albedo than the Martian soil), but would not affect the albedo of the planet as a whole.

On April 26, 2012, scientists reported that lichen survived and showed remarkable results on the adaptation capacity of photosynthetic activity within the simulation time of 34 days under Martian conditions in the Mars Simulation Laboratory (MSL) maintained by the German Aerospace Center (DLR).

One final issue with albedo reduction is the common Martian dust storms. These cover the entire planet for weeks, and not only increase the albedo, but block sunlight from reaching the surface. This has been observed to cause a surface temperature drop which the planet takes months to recover from. Once the dust settles it then covers whatever it lands on, effectively erasing the albedo reduction material from the view of the Sun.

Funded research: ecopoiesis

Since 2014, the NASA Institute for Advanced Concepts (NIAC) program and Techshot Inc have been working together to develop sealed biodomes that would employ colonies of oxygen-producing cyanobacteria and algae for the production of molecular oxygen (O2) on Martian soil. But first they need to test if it works on a small scale on Mars. The proposal is called Mars Ecopoiesis Test Bed. Eugene Boland is the Chief Scientist at Techshot, a company located in Greenville, Indiana. They intend to send small canisters of extremophile photosynthetic algae and cyanobacteria aboard a future rover mission. The rover would cork-screw the  canisters into selected sites likely to experience transients of liquid water, drawing some Martian soil and then release oxygen-producing microorganisms to grow within the sealed soil. The hardware would use Martian subsurface ice as its phase changes into liquid water. The system would then look for oxygen given off as metabolic byproduct and report results to a Mars-orbiting relay satellite.

If this experiment works on Mars, they will propose to build several large and sealed structures called biodomes, to produce and harvest oxygen for a future human mission to Mars life support systems. Being able to create oxygen there would provide considerable cost-savings to NASA and allow for longer human visits to Mars than would be possible if astronauts have to transport their own heavy oxygen tanks. This biological process, called ecopoiesis, would be isolated, in contained areas, and is not meant as a type of global planetary engineering for terraforming of Mars's atmosphere, but NASA states that "This will be the first major leap from laboratory studies into the implementation of experimental (as opposed to analytical) planetary in situ research of greatest interest to planetary biology, ecopoiesis, and terraforming."

Research at the University of Arkansas presented in June 2015 suggested that some methanogens could survive in Mars's low pressure. Rebecca Mickol found that in her laboratory, four species of methanogens survived low-pressure conditions that were similar to a subsurface liquid aquifer on Mars.  The four species that she tested were Methanothermobacter wolfeii, Methanosarcina barkeri, Methanobacterium formicicum, and  Methanococcus maripaludis. Methanogens do not require oxygen or organic nutrients, are non-photosynthetic, use hydrogen as their energy source and carbon dioxide (CO2) as their carbon source, so they could exist in subsurface environments on Mars.

Protecting the atmosphere

One key aspect of terraforming Mars is to protect the atmosphere (both present and future-built) from being lost into space. Some scientists hypothesize that creating a planet-wide artificial magnetosphere would be helpful in resolving this issue. According to two NIFS Japanese scientists, it is feasible to do that with current technology by building a system of refrigerated latitudinal superconducting rings, each carrying a sufficient amount of direct current.

In the same report, it is claimed that the economic impact of the system can be minimized by using it also as a planetary energy transfer and storage system (SMES).

Magnetic shield at L1 orbit

During the Planetary Science Vision 2050 Workshop in late February 2017, NASA scientist Jim Green proposed a concept of placing a magnetic dipole field between the planet and the Sun to protect it from high-energy solar particles. It would be located at the Mars Lagrange orbit L1 at about 320 R♂, creating a partial and distant artificial magnetosphere. The field would need to be "Earth comparable" and sustain  as measured at 1 Earth-radius. If constructed, the shield may allow the planet to partially restore its atmosphere.

Plasma torus along the orbit of Phobos
A plasma torus along the orbit of Phobos by ionizing and accelerating particles from the moon may be sufficient to create a magnetic field strong enough to protect a terraformed Mars.

Thermodynamics of terraforming
If using orbital mirrors, an estimated 120 MW-years of electrical energy would be required in order to produce mirrors large enough to vaporize the ice caps. This is considered the most effective method, though the least practical. If using powerful halocarbon greenhouse gases, an order of 1,000 MW-years of electrical energy would be required to accomplish this heating. However, if all of this  were put into the atmosphere,
it would only double the current atmospheric pressure from 6 mbar to 12 mbar, amounting to about 1.2% of Earth's mean sea level pressure. The amount of warming that could be produced today by putting even 100 mbar of  into the atmosphere is small, roughly of order . Additionally, once in the atmosphere, it likely would be removed quickly, either by diffusion into the subsurface and adsorption or by re-condensing onto the polar caps.

The surface or atmospheric temperature required to allow liquid water to exist has not been determined, and liquid water

See also
 
 Areography (geography of Mars)

References

External links

Recent Arthur C Clarke interview mentions terraforming
Red Colony
Terraformers Society of Canada
Research Paper: Technological Requirements for Terraforming Mars
Peter Ahrens The Terraformation of Worlds

Climate of Mars
Exploration of Mars
Mars
Science fiction